Chess Valley RFC is a rugby union club originally from Rickmansworth but now based in Croxley Green, Hertfordshire.  It is a member of the Hertfordshire Football Union and the Rugby Football Union. It is a community club and fields adult Men's, Youth and Minis sides

Adult Rugby 
The senior men's section of the club fields two sides.

For the 2022/2023 season the 1st XV are again playing in Counties 3 Herts/Middx. The 2nd XV are playing in Herts/Middx Merit League 7 (SW). 

Games take place on Saturday afternoons with training being held on Tuesday and Thursday evenings.

Women's Rugby 
The 2009/2010 season saw Chess Valley put together its first senior Ladies side. They managed to win their first piece of silverware, winning the Windsor 7's Plate Final 41-0 against Thames Valley Ladies. There is currently no women's team.

Youth Rugby 

For the 2013-14 season CVRFC fields sides within the U18, U16 x2 teams, U14 and U13 age groups playing within the Herts and Middx leagues.

2008/2009 season saw the first Junior side put out by Chess Valley in the U13 age group. For the 2010/2011 Season Juniors are represented at U13's and U15's. For the 2012/13 season youth sides will be represented with one under 17s team (div 5) two under 15s teams (div 2 and 7) and an under 13s team (div 4)

In the 2011/2012 season the U14's have won an amazing 6 trophy's including Saracens JP Morgan 7's tournament, The Hertfordshire 10s Cup tournament, Leicester tigers tiger challenge, Aylesbury 10s, the Hertfordshire plate tournament, and finally league three championship gaining promotion to league two. To win all this silverware the Valley under 14s have beaten Cheshunt, Aylesbury, Hemel, Fullerians, Minehead, Datchworth, Old Albanians and Saracens Amateurs to name a few. Three players have been selected to county and two to Herts school of rugby with good hopes of more lads being selected next season. 2013 the now U16's are playing in division one having been promoted for the fourth consecutive year

Training is mid-week and games are played on Sunday mornings. Sundays without games are also used to train.

Junior Rugby 
The Junior section of the club was started in the 1998/1999 season. Training and games take place on Sunday mornings.

Children playing U7s and U8s (stage 1) play Mini-Tag Rugby, U9s and U10s (stage 2) play Mini Rugby and U11s and U12s (stage 3) play Midi Rugby. A player’s age grade is determined by their age at midnight on 31 August at the beginning of each Season. The only exception to this are players that turn six during the season may start to play immediately rather than waiting until the following season.

Match & Training Venues

Croxley Guild of Sport 
The new home of Chess Valley having left their original ground and birthplace Rickmansworth Sports Club at the end of the 2012/13 season. Senior training and fixtures are usually played here.

Croxley Guild of Sport
The Green
Rickmansworth
WD3 3HT

Rickmansworth School and St Joan of Arc School
Training and fixtures are played at local schools for both the Mini's and the Junior sides.

Rickmansworth School
Scots Hill
Rickmansworth
Hertfordshire
WD3 3AQ

History 
Formed in 1996, it is one of the youngest rugby clubs in Hertfordshire.

The club is often fondly referred to as "The Valley" by players and supporters.

Club Officers History

Club Honours
Herts/Middlesex 4 North champions: 1998–99
Herts/Middlesex 3 North champions: 2001–02

References

External links
 Official Web Site
 Pitchero Site
 Senior 1st XV Herts/Middlesex Results
 2022/23 Counties 3 Herts/Middx Table
 Colts Division 2 Herts Middlesex Junior Leagues
 U16's Division 2 Herts Middlesex Junior Leagues
 U15's Division 3 Herts Middlesex Junior Leagues
 U14's Pool B Herts Middlesex Junior Leagues
 U13's Pool B Herts Middlesex Junior Leagues

See also
Hertfordshire RFU
Middlesex RFU
English rugby union system
Rugby union in England

English rugby union teams
Rugby union clubs in Hertfordshire
Rugby clubs established in 1996
1996 establishments in England